Edalorhina is a small genus of leptodactylid frogs. They are found in Colombia, Ecuador, Peru and western Brazil. They are sometimes known as the snouted frogs.

Species
The genus contains only the following two species:
 Edalorhina nasuta Boulenger, 1912
 Edalorhina perezi Jiménez de la Espada, 1870

References

 
Leptodactylidae
Amphibians of South America
Taxa named by Marcos Jiménez de la Espada
Amphibian genera